Castro City may refer to:
Castro City, Mountain View, California
Castro, Lazio, Italy, Renaissance city razed in 1649